Zeuxinia is a monotypic moth genus of the family Erebidae. Its only species, Zeuxinia aeschrina, is found on Aldabra, a coral atoll in the Seychelles. Both the genus and the species were first described by Henry Legrand in 1966.

References

Hypeninae
Monotypic moth genera